The 2020 Mississippi College Choctaws football team represented Mississippi College as a member of the Gulf South Conference (GSC) during the 2020 NCAA Division II football season. They were led by seventh-year head coach John Bland. The Choctaws were to have played their home games at Robinson-Hale Stadium in Clinton, Mississippi.

Fall season delayed
On August 12, 2020, Gulf South Conference postponed fall competition for several sports due to the COVID-19 pandemic. A few months later in November, the conference announced that there will be no spring conference competition in football. Teams that opt-in to compete would have to schedule on their own.

Before the November announcement, the Choctaws had already scheduled their first opponent of the spring competition, Tarleton State a month before in October.

Schedule

References

Mississippi College
Mississippi College Choctaws football seasons
College football winless seasons
Mississippi College Choctaws football